In Greek mythology, the Pallantidai were the fifty sons of Pallas, younger brother of Aegeus, king of Athens.

Mythology 
Diodorus Siculus related that the Pallantides once became friends with Androgeos, a son of Minos, and that was why Aegeus had Androgeos assassinated, fearing that Pallas and his sons could use this friendship to get assistance from the powerful Minos against him. The Pallantidae and their father marched against Theseus and Aegeus in order to seize the throne; according to Plutarch, one half of them under command of Pallas openly marched on Athens from Sphettus, while the other half laid in ambush near Gargettus. However, their herald Leos warned Theseus of their schemes and Theseus pre-emptively ambushed the Pallantides and killed all those at Gargettus, whereupon the other half retreated. Other sources state that Theseus killed all the fifty Pallantidae as well as Pallas. A tradition saying that he spared their sister, Aricia, whom he kept as slave, is followed in Jean Racine's Phèdre but is not supported by extant genuinely ancient sources.

Ovid mentioned two of the Pallantidae, Butes and Clytus, as companions of Cephalus. but other than this, no individual names of any of the Pallantidae survived.

Some scholars believe that the east frieze of the Hephaisteion depicts the battle of Theseus against the Pallantidae.

Notes

References 

 Apollodorus, The Library with an English Translation by Sir James George Frazer, F.B.A., F.R.S. in 2 Volumes, Cambridge, MA, Harvard University Press; London, William Heinemann Ltd. 1921. ISBN 0-674-99135-4. Online version at the Perseus Digital Library. Greek text available from the same website.
 Diodorus Siculus, The Library of History translated by Charles Henry Oldfather. Twelve volumes. Loeb Classical Library. Cambridge, Massachusetts: Harvard University Press; London: William Heinemann, Ltd. 1989. Vol. 3. Books 4.59–8. Online version at Bill Thayer's Web Site
 Diodorus Siculus, Bibliotheca Historica. Vol 1-2. Immanel Bekker. Ludwig Dindorf. Friedrich Vogel. in aedibus B. G. Teubneri. Leipzig. 1888-1890. Greek text available at the Perseus Digital Library.
 Lucius Mestrius Plutarchus, Lives with an English Translation by Bernadotte Perrin. Cambridge, MA. Harvard University Press. London. William Heinemann Ltd. 1914. 1. Online version at the Perseus Digital Library. Greek text available from the same website.
 Pausanias, Description of Greece with an English Translation by W.H.S. Jones, Litt.D., and H.A. Ormerod, M.A., in 4 Volumes. Cambridge, MA, Harvard University Press; London, William Heinemann Ltd. 1918. . Online version at the Perseus Digital Library
 Pausanias, Graeciae Descriptio. 3 vols. Leipzig, Teubner. 1903.  Greek text available at the Perseus Digital Library.
 Publius Ovidius Naso, Metamorphoses translated by Brookes More (1859-1942). Boston, Cornhill Publishing Co. 1922. Online version at the Perseus Digital Library.
 Publius Ovidius Naso, Metamorphoses. Hugo Magnus. Gotha (Germany). Friedr. Andr. Perthes. 1892. Latin text available at the Perseus Digital Library.

Attican characters in Greek mythology